Kimberly Joanna Surio Flores (born 3 April 1996) is an American-raised Salvadoran footballer who plays as a forward for El Salvador women's national team.

Early life
Surio was born to Salvadoran parents and was raised in Los Angeles, California.

International career
Surio capped for El Salvador at senior level during the 2020 CONCACAF Women's Olympic Qualifying Championship qualification.

See also
List of El Salvador women's international footballers

References 

1996 births
Living people
Salvadoran women's footballers
Women's association football forwards
El Salvador women's international footballers
Soccer players from Los Angeles
American women's soccer players

Chowan University alumni
College women's soccer players in the United States

California State University, Los Angeles alumni

American sportspeople of Salvadoran descent